Sonja Skarstedt (October 2, 1960 – July 31, 2009) was a Canadian poet, short story, playwright writer, painter and illustrator. Born in Montreal, Quebec, she was the founder and former editor of the literary magazine Zymergy, 1987-1991, and founder of Empyreal Press, 1990. She graduated from McGill University with a BA in English Literature in 1982. She was married to the artist and comic book illustrator Geof Isherwood.

In 2008, Skarstedt began the first of over thirty short film productions on YouTube's Skarwood Channel.

Skarstedt died July 31, 2009 at the age of 48, 26 months after diagnosis and treatment for ovarian cancer.

Bibliography

Poetry 
Mythographies — 1990
A Demolition Symphony — 1995
Beautiful Chaos — 2000
In the House of the Sun — 2005

Drama 
Saint Francis of Esplanade — 2001

Fiction 
12 X 93 — 1993 (with Brian Busby & Robert Edison Sandiford)

Anthologies edited 
Eternal Conversations: Remembering Louis Dudek — 2003 (with Aileen Collins & Michael Gnarowski)

External links

References

1960 births
2009 deaths
Artists from Montreal
Canadian people of Norwegian descent
Canadian women short story writers
Canadian women dramatists and playwrights
Canadian women poets
Canadian women painters
McGill University alumni
Writers from Montreal
20th-century Canadian painters
21st-century Canadian painters
20th-century Canadian poets
21st-century Canadian poets
20th-century Canadian dramatists and playwrights
21st-century Canadian dramatists and playwrights
20th-century Canadian women writers
21st-century Canadian women writers
20th-century Canadian short story writers
21st-century Canadian short story writers